Bethel Military Academy was a school near Warrenton, Virginia in Fauquier County. It operated from 1867 until 1911 and had several prominent alumni. The Virginia General Assembly passed a bill in 1901 incorporating the school. The bill included a requirement that one student chosen from each district of Virginia was granted tuition free admission to the school.

The 1896 Maryland Aggies football team played against Bethel Academy. Kappa Sigma Kappa fraternity had a branch at the school for a few years.

Buttons worn on a uniform from the school include the Virginia state seal of Virtus slaying the giant.

Alumni
John L. McLaurin, U.S. Representative
Theodore G. Croft, U.S. Representative
Charles W. Field (1857–1917), Maryland state delegate
Leon Lydecker Freeman, local mayor and former owner of the Freeman House Store
Frank Owens Smith, U.S. Representative
David D. Terry, U.S. Representative
Howard W. Smith, U.S. Representative

Further reading
The History of Bethel Military Academy, Warrenton, Virginia by Peter Bartow Smith University of Virginia M.A. dissertation 1945.

References

Educational institutions established in 1867
Educational institutions disestablished in 1911
Defunct schools in Virginia
1867 establishments in Virginia
1911 disestablishments in the United States
Schools in Fauquier County, Virginia